Baseline/Central Avenue is an under-construction light rail station on the Valley Metro system in Phoenix. It is the southern terminus of the South Central Extension, located on Central Avenue at Baseline Road, and is expected to open in 2024. The station includes a park-and-ride facility.

References

Valley Metro Rail stations in Phoenix, Arizona
Railway stations scheduled to open in 2024
Railway stations under construction in the United States
Future Valley Metro Rail stations